Mount Cherry-Garrard is a peak at the seaward end of the divide between Simpson Glacier and Fendley Glacier, on the north coast of Victoria Land, Antarctica. The topographical feature was first charted by the Northern Party, led by Victor Campbell, of the British Antarctic Expedition, 1910–13. They named the feature for Apsley Cherry-Garrard, Assistant Zoologist on the expedition. The mountain lies situated on the Pennell Coast, a portion of Antarctica lying between Cape Williams and Cape Adare.

References
 

Mountains of Victoria Land
Pennell Coast